The FAW Elite Futsal League is a futsal league featuring  teams based in Wales. It was initially planned that the league would develop into a full national league.

In 2011, The New Saints won the inaugural FAW Futsal Cup.

Winners
2010-2011 - The New Saints Futsal Club
2011-2012 - Cardiff University Futsal Club
2012-2013 - Wrexham Futsal Club
2013-2014 - Cardiff University Futsal Club
2014-2015 - Wrexham Futsal Club
2015-2016 - Cardiff University Futsal Club
2016-2017 - Wrexham Futsal Club
2017-2018 - Cardiff University Futsal Club

See also 
FAW Futsal Cup

References

External links
  The FAW Official website
 FAW Futsal on Facebook
 FAW Futsal on Twitter

Wales
Futsal competitions in Wales
Football leagues in Wales
Sports leagues established in 2010
2010 establishments in Wales